Joneleit is a surname. Notable people with the surname include:

Jens Joneleit (born 1968), German classical composer
Torben Joneleit (born 1987), Monegasque-born German footballer